Balázs Bús (born 29 January 1966) is a Hungarian social worker and politician, who served as Mayor of Óbuda-Békásmegyer (3rd district of Budapest) between 2006 and 2019. Besides that he represented Óbuda-Békásmegyer (Budapest Constituency IV) in the National Assembly of Hungary from 2010 to 2014.

References

1966 births
Living people
Fidesz politicians
Christian Democratic People's Party (Hungary) politicians
Members of the National Assembly of Hungary (2010–2014)
Mayors of places in Hungary
Politicians from Budapest